East Murchison is a locality in the Mid West region of Western Australia.

Demographics
At the 2016 census, the median age of persons in East Murchison was 44 years. There were less males than females, with 33.3% of the population male and 66.7% female. The average household size was 0 people per household.

References 

Towns in Western Australia
Mid West (Western Australia)